Tafi may refer to:

People
Andrea Tafi (disambiguation), several people
Noushin Tafi (born 1981)

Places
Darreh Tefi (disambiguation)
Tafí del Valle
Tafí Viejo, Tucumán

Other
Nyangbo-Tafi language

See also
TAFI (disambiguation)